This battle took place on 26 May 1646 at the mouth of the Dardanelles Strait. The Ottoman fleet under Kapudan Pasha Kara Musa Pasha, tried to defeat the Venetian fleet, under Tommaso Morosini, that was blockading the Dardanelles. After seven hours, the Ottoman fleet withdrew back into the Strait. Several Turkish ships were damaged, but none lost.

Ships involved

Venice
 7 sailing ships

Turkey
 5 galleasses
 75 galleys

References

1646
Conflicts in 1646